Jiske Griffioen and Aniek van Koot defeated Lucy Shuker and Jordanne Whiley in the final, 6–1, 6–2 to win the ladies' doubles wheelchair tennis title at the 2012 Wimbledon Championships. Griffioen completed the career Grand Slam with the win.

Esther Vergeer and Sharon Walraven were the two-time defending champions, but did not play together. Vergeer partnered Marjolein Buis and Walraven partnered Annick Sevenans, but both pairs were defeated in the semifinals.

Seeds

  Marjolein Buis /  Esther Vergeer (semifinals, third place)
  Annick Sevenans /  Sharon Walraven (semifinals, fourth place)

Draw

Finals

References
Draw

Wheelchair Women's Doubles
Wimbledon Championship by year – Wheelchair women's doubles